Joseph Bradshaw Godber, Baron Godber of Willington,  (17 March 1914 – 25 August 1980) was a British Conservative Party politician and cabinet minister.

Background
Godber was educated at Bedford School, between 1922 and 1931, and became a nurseryman. He became chairman of the county glasshouse section of the National Farmers Union and of the publicity and parliamentary committee. He was a member of the Tomato and Cucumber Marketing Board.

Political career
Godber was a Bedfordshire County Councillor from 1946 until 1952. He was elected Member of Parliament for Grantham in 1951, a seat he held until 1979. He served under Harold Macmillan as Parliamentary Secretary to the Ministry of Agriculture, Fisheries and Food from 1957 to 1960, as Parliamentary Under-Secretary of State for Foreign Affairs from 1960 to 1961, as Minister of State for Foreign Affairs from 1961 to 1963 and as Secretary of State for War in 1963, under Sir Alec Douglas-Home as Minister of Labour from 1963 to 1964 and under Edward Heath as Minister of State for Foreign and Commonwealth Affairs from 1970 to 1972  and as Minister of Agriculture, Fisheries and Food from 1972 to 1974. Godber was appointed a Privy Counsellor in 1963 and in 1979 he was made a life peer as Baron Godber of Willington, of Willington in the County of Bedfordshire.

Personal life
Lord Godber of Willington died in August 1980, aged 66. In 1936, he married Miriam Sanders in Bedford. They had two sons (including one born in 1938 and the other in 1944). He has 5 grandchildren (Amanda Varley, James R B Godber, Joe Godber, Victoria Bell and Pete Godber) and 9 great-grandchildren (Lucy Varley, Naomi Godber, Jude Godber, Noah Godber, Ruby-Rose Godber, Emily Godber, Tom Godber, Edward Bell and Jack Bell)

References

Times Guide to the House of Commons 1979

External links 
 
 

1914 births
1980 deaths
British Secretaries of State
Conservative Party (UK) MPs for English constituencies
Councillors in Bedfordshire
Godber of Willington
Members of the Privy Council of the United Kingdom
Agriculture ministers of the United Kingdom
People educated at Bedford School
Secretaries of State for War (UK)
UK MPs 1951–1955
UK MPs 1955–1959
UK MPs 1959–1964
UK MPs 1964–1966
UK MPs 1966–1970
UK MPs 1970–1974
UK MPs 1974
UK MPs 1974–1979
Politics of Grantham
Joseph
Ministers in the Macmillan and Douglas-Home governments, 1957–1964
Life peers created by Elizabeth II